Benjamin Sidney Clime (October 14, 1891 – January 13, 1973) was an American football guard who played two seasons in the American Professional Football Association with the Rochester Jeffersons. He played college football at Swarthmore College and attended Central High School in Philadelphia, Pennsylvania.

References

External links
Just Sports Stats

1891 births
1973 deaths
Players of American football from Philadelphia
American football guards
Rochester Jeffersons players
Swarthmore Garnet Tide football players
Central High School (Philadelphia) alumni